The Parachute Infantry Brigade is an airborne brigade of the Brazilian Army.

Units
 HQ Company Parachutist Infantry Brigade (Companhia de Comando da Brigada de Infantaria Paraquedista) in Rio de Janeiro
 25th Parachutist Infantry Battalion (25º Batalhão de Infantaria Paraquedista) in Rio de Janeiro
 26th Parachutist Infantry Battalion (26º Batalhão de Infantaria Paraquedista) in Rio de Janeiro
 27th Parachutist Infantry Battalion (27º Batalhão de Infantaria Paraquedista) in Rio de Janeiro
 8th Parachutist Field Artillery Group (8º Grupo de Artilharia de Campanha Paraquedista) in Rio de Janeiro
 20th Parachutist Logistics Battalion (20º Batalhão Logístico Paraquedista) in Rio de Janeiro
 Parachutist Support & Maintenance Battalion (Batalhão de Dobragem, Manutenção de Paraquedista) in Rio de Janeiro
 Pathfinders Company (Companhia de Precursores Paraquedista) in Rio de Janeiro
 1st Parachutist Cavalry Squadron (1º Esquadrão de Cavalaria Paraquedista) in Rio de Janeiro
 21st Parachutist Air Defence Artillery Battery (21ª Bateria de Artilharia Anti-Aérea Paraquedista) in Rio de Janeiro
 1st Parachutist Combat Engineer Company (1ª Companhia de Engenharia de Combate Paraquedista) in Rio de Janeiro
 20th Parachutist Signals Company (20ª Companhia de Comunicações Paraquedista) in Rio de Janeiro
 36th Parachutist Military Police Platoon (36º Pelotão de Polícia do Exército Paraquedista) in Rio de Janeiro
 (Destacamento de Saúde Paraquedista) in Rio de Janeiro

References

Army units and formations of Brazil
Airborne infantry brigades
Military units and formations established in 1945